Maaman Magal is a 1955 Indian Tamil-language romantic comedy film written, produced and directed by R. S. Mani. The film stars Gemini Ganesan, Savitri, T. S. Balaiah and J. P. Chandrababu. Released on 14 October 1955, it was a moderate success.

Plot 
Dharmalingam is a rich man with only one daughter Malathi. His late wife left a will stating the daughter Malathi should be married to her missing brother's son, who would inherit her wealth. Dharmalingam sends his friend Kanniyappan, who is after the young women and her property, in search of him. The crook sets up his nephew Thandavam as the missing man and the father decides to get the two married. Meanwhile, another shy young man Chandran, who never looks any women in the eyes, becomes Malathi's teacher. The two falls in love and decide to marry. Scared stiff, Kanniyappan manages to get Chandran dismissed from his job. Chandran grandmother Kamatchi gives him magic armour which will make him tough and bold. Chandran returns to his heartthrob disguised as an elderly gardener. The will suddenly disappears and more complications crop up. However, the truth surfaces, Kanniyappan is exposed, and the lovers unite.

Cast 
 Gemini Ganesan as Chandran
 Savitri as Malathi
 T. S. Balaiah as Kanniyappan
 D. Balasubramaniam as Dharmalingam
 J. P. Chandrababu as Thandavam
 T. S. Durairaj as Vingnanam
 Lakshmi Prabha as Gnanam
 S. R. Janaki as Kamakshi
 C. K. Saraswathi as Thandavam's sister
 O. A. K. Thevar as Veerasamy

Production 
Maaman Magal was produced and directed by R. S. Mani, who also wrote the story. The dialogue was written by C. V. Sridhar, not yet the acclaimed filmmaker he would later become. Cinematography was handled by Nemai Ghosh, and the editing by K. Govindasamy.

Soundtrack 
The soundtrack was composed by S. V. Venkatraman and the lyrics were written by Papanasam Sivan, Thanjai N. Ramaiah Dass, Kambadasan, Surabhi, M. K. Aathmanathan and Seetharaman. The song "Govaa maambazhamey, Malgovaa Maambazhamey", picturised on Chandrababu and Dorairaj's characters, where the former expresses his love for Malathi (Savitri), looking at her photograph, became popular. Words in the song like ‘samaalakkidi girigiri..., saavuttu paaru vadakari...’ contributed to its popularity.

Release and reception 
Maaman Magal was released on 14 October 1955, and emerged a moderate success.

References

External links 

1950s Tamil-language films
1955 films
1955 romantic comedy films
Films scored by S. V. Venkatraman
Films with screenplays by C. V. Sridhar
Indian black-and-white films
Indian romantic comedy films